Kiriti Roy is a Bengali thriller drama film directed by Aniket Chattopadhyay and produced by Ashok Dhanuka. This film was released on 30 December 2016 in the banner of Eskay Movies. It is based on Nihar Ranjan Gupta's Kiriti Roy series, Setarer Sur.

Plot
The film revolves around a story of love, jealousy and murder mystery. While walking in a street of Kolkata, Detective Kiriti Roy and his assistant Subrata save Sunil, who was administered a lethal dose of morphine. Kiriti thinks that there is a link between this incident and the very recent murder case of Basabi. Basabi was a beautiful young woman who was about to marry Brajesh but, before the wedding, she was found dead. Kiriti suspects Brajesh along with his four friends, including Sunil.

Cast
 Chiranjit as Kiriti Roy
 Locket Chatterjee as Krishna
 Sujan Mukhopadhyay as Subrato
 Swastika Mukherjee as Junifer
 Kaushik Ganguly as Inspector Rathin Sikdar
 Saayoni Ghosh
 Kanchana Moitra
 Joy Badlani
 Krishnokishore Mukherjee
 Ankita Chakraborty
 Joy Badlani
 Debranjan Nag
 Soumyajit Majumdar

References

External links
 

2016 films
Indian thriller drama films
Indian detective films
Films based on Indian novels
Films directed by Aniket Chattopadhyay
Bengali-language Indian films
2010s Bengali-language films
2016 thriller films
Films based on works by Nihar Ranjan Gupta